Ma Mingyu (born 4 February 1970, in Chongqing, Sichuan) is a former Chinese International football player. He represented Sichuan Quanxing throughout the majority of his career, having several spells with them. He also represented Guangdong Hongyuan and Italian Serie A side Perugia. While internationally he would play in the 1996 AFC Asian Cup, 2000 AFC Asian Cup and captain China's campaign during the 2002 FIFA World Cup.

Playing career
Ma Mingyu predominantly played for top tier Chinese club Sichuan Guancheng where he spent several spells with them throughout his football career. In his first spell with them he would attract attention from Guangdong Hongyuan after Ma had a prolific 1994 league season that saw him play 21 games and score 3 goals.
Ma would move to Guangdong Hongyuan at the beginning of 1995 league season, however despite a promising start that saw Guangdong come 4th in the league his time with Guangdong saw him win nothing with them and after a disappointing 1996 league season that saw Guangdong come 9th, Ma returned to Sichuan.

Ma Mingyu's second spell at Sichuan Guancheng was to prove considerably more successful with Sichuan as they were genuine title contenders during this period and came 3rd in the 1999 and 2000 league seasons. With Ma firmly established as a permanent fixture within Sichuan's left midfield and becoming a member of the Chinese national team he would attract attention from Italian team Perugia Calcio in the Serie A in the 2000–01 season. His time at Perugia, however was a disaster as he played in no games for them and he returned to Sichuan Guancheng where he has started to play first team football on a regular basis in preparation for the World Cup. At the end of the 2003 league season he would decide to retire from professional football.

International career
As an attacking left-footed midfielder Ma Mingyu would break into the senior team on 30 January 1996, when he made his debut in a qualifier for the 1996 AFC Asian Cup against Macau in a 7–1 victory. In the next qualifying game against the Philippines on 1 February 1996, he would score his first goal in a 7–0 victory. After several friendlies he would go to establish himself as a regular within the squad and then go to the 1996 AFC Asian Cup. At the end of the campaign, he had become an integral member of the Chinese team and when Bora Milutinović came in as the new head coach Ma Mingyu would be named as his captain. During his captaincy he would lead China to a fourth-place finish at the 2000 AFC Asian Cup and see the team qualify for their first FIFA World Cup tournament. Once Bora Milutinović left at the end of the campaign Ma Mingyu's international career would also end.

International goals

Career statistics

International statistics

References

External links

2002 World Cup squad profile at BBC.co.uk

1970 births
Living people
Chinese footballers
Footballers from Chongqing
China international footballers
1996 AFC Asian Cup players
2000 AFC Asian Cup players
2002 FIFA World Cup players
Sichuan Guancheng players
Chinese expatriate footballers
Expatriate footballers in Italy
Guangdong Winnerway F.C. players
A.C. Perugia Calcio players
Asian Games medalists in football
Footballers at the 1998 Asian Games
Asian Games bronze medalists for China
Association football midfielders
Medalists at the 1998 Asian Games